Chandni Chowk is a station on the Yellow Line of the Delhi Metro. It serves the Chandni Chowk market area, and is near the Red Fort. It is also walking distance to the Old Delhi Railway Station of Indian Railways.

Facilities
List of available ATM at Chandni Chowk Metro station are State Bank of India
Public toilets are present inside station premises.
Ticket vending machines are available in the metro station.

Station layout

Entry/exit
Gate  no. 1 entry/exit from/towards Chandni Chowk market and Town hall. 
Gate no 2 and 3 towards Delhi public library and Delhi junction. 
Gate no. 4  is under renovation currently. 
Gate no. 5  is used for entry only.

Connections

Passengers can access Delhi Junction (Popularly known as Old Delhi Railway Station) by exiting from Gate No. 3 of Chandni chowk metro station.

See also
Chandni Chowk
Red Fort
Old Delhi Railway Station
List of Delhi Metro stations
Transport in Delhi
Delhi Metro Rail Corporation
Delhi Suburban Railway
Delhi Transport Corporation
North Delhi
National Capital Region (India)
List of rapid transit systems
List of metro systems

References

External links

 Delhi Metro Rail Corporation Ltd. (Official site) 
 Delhi Metro Annual Reports
 
 UrbanRail.Net – descriptions of all metro systems in the world, each with a schematic map showing all stations.

Delhi Metro stations
Railway stations opened in 2005
Railway stations in North Delhi district